is the first compilation album of the Japanese boy band, Arashi. The album is also the first album of the group to be released under the J Storm record label. The album contains all of the singles the band released since their inception in 1999 to 2001 as well as several album tracks.

Track listing

Charts

Release history

References

External links
 Arashi Single Collection 1999-2001 

Arashi albums
2002 greatest hits albums
J Storm compilation albums